Penhoek Pass is a mountain pass situated in the Stormberg Mountains of the Eastern Cape province of South Africa. It lies about 60 km north of Queenstown on the national road N6 to Jamestown and Aliwal North.

The pass was constructed in 1892, reaches a height of 1 844 m above sea level and has a maximum gradient of 1:10.

Mountain passes of the Eastern Cape